Sobusa Gula-Ndebele is the former Attorney General of Zimbabwe. He was appointed to the position in 2006 by Robert Mugabe, and his mandate was briefly renewed in 2007. However, following ZANU-PF infighting, Gula-Ndebele was placed on a period of suspension in March 2007, before being dismissed from office in May 2008. He was succeeded by Justice Bharat Patel, who served as acting AG until Mugabe appointed Johannes Tomana as the permanent Attorney-General in December.

Gula-Ndebele is a retired army colonel who was among the country's feared military intelligence supremos in the 1980s. After independence, he practiced as a lawyer, establishing the law firm Gula-Ndebele and Partners Legal Practitioners. He is a former chairman of the Electoral Supervisory Commission

References

1954 births
Living people
Attorneys-General of Zimbabwe
ZANU–PF politicians
Members of the Senate of Zimbabwe